The 1932 Star Riders' Championship was the fourth edition of the speedway Star Riders' Championship. The competition was decided on a knockout basis over nine heats.

Final 
22 September 1932
 Wembley, England

Heat details
Heat 1 : Byers, Dook, Arthur
Heat 2 : Case, N Parker (Ret), Johnson (Fell)
Heat 3 : Langton, Wotton, Jackson (Ret)
Heat 4 : Huxley, Spencer, Phillips
Heat 5 : J Parker, Varey, Croombs
Heat 6 : Lees, Farndon, Clibbett

Semi-final 1  : Case, Langton, J Parker 
Semi-final 2  : Huxley, Byers, Lees (Fell)

Final : Langton, Huxley, Case (Fell)

References

1932
Speedway
Star Riders' Championship